Tom Robin de Blok (born May 8, 1996) is a Dutch professional baseball pitcher who is a free agent. He played for Team Netherlands in the 2019 European Baseball Championship, and at the Africa/Europe 2020 Olympic Qualification tournament in Italy in September 2019.

Career

Seattle Mariners
On August 26, 2013, de Blok signed a minor league contract with the Seattle Mariners organization. However, on April 17, 2014, de Blok retired from professional baseball without playing in a game for the organization.

Mr. Cocker HCAW
de Blok came out of retirement to join Mr. Cocker HCAW for the 2014 season, a team in the Honkbal Hoofdklasse, the top baseball league in the Netherlands, where he posted a 3.20 ERA in 17 appearances.

Amsterdam Pirates
The following season, de Blok joined the Amsterdam Pirates, where he posted a 4-0 record and 1.54 ERA in 20 games with the team. After the season, de Blok was offered a tryout with the Rakuten Golden Eagles of Nippon Professional Baseball (NPB), the top baseball league in Japan. After the tryout de Blok decided to return to the Pirates. That season, he recorded a 5-0 record and 0.88 ERA with 43 strikeouts in 41.0 innings of work.

Detroit Tigers
After a good performance in the 2017 World Baseball Classic, de Blok signed a four-year minor league deal with the Detroit Tigers organization on April 10, 2017. He made his affiliated debut for the Low-A Connecticut Tigers, and after pitching 3.2 scoreless innings, was promoted to the Single-A West Michigan Whitecaps, where he spent the rest of the season, posting a 4-2 record and 2.87 ERA with a 1.02 WHIP in 82 innings pitched. de Blok spent the 2019 season with Lakeland, recording a 2-13 record and 4.04 ERA in 21 games. de Blok did not play in a game for the Tigers organization in 2020 after the minor league season was cancelled due to the COVID-19 pandemic. On November 2, 2020, he elected free agency.

Amsterdam Pirates (second stint)
de Blok returned to the Amsterdam Pirates following his stint with the Tigers organization after logging a 2.00 ERA in 5 games with the team in 2020. In 2021, de Blok posted a 3-2 record and 1.64 ERA in 6 games with the team. On May 14, 2021, de Blok threw the fourth perfect game in the history of the Dutch Major Leagues, defeating Corendon Kinheim 12-0 while striking out seven.

Pericos de Puebla
On June 27, 2021, de Blok signed with the Pericos de Puebla of the Mexican League. He made just one start before he was released on July 8, 2021.

International career
de Blok was a member of the Netherlands national baseball team in the  2017 World Baseball Classic.

He played for Team Netherlands in the 2019 European Baseball Championship, at the Africa/Europe 2020 Olympic Qualification tournament in Italy in September 2019.

References

External links

1996 births
Living people
Sportspeople from Amstelveen
Dutch expatriate baseball players in the United States
Baseball pitchers
L&D Amsterdam Pirates players
Mr. Cocker HCAW players
Connecticut Tigers players
West Michigan Whitecaps players
Lakeland Flying Tigers players
2016 European Baseball Championship players
2017 World Baseball Classic players
2019 European Baseball Championship players
2023 World Baseball Classic players
Pericos de Puebla players
Dutch expatriate baseball players in Mexico